Deuterophysa is a genus of moths of the family Crambidae described by Warren in 1889.

Species
Deuterophysa albilunalis (Hampson, 1913)
Deuterophysa asychanalis Warren, 1889
Deuterophysa baracoalis (Schaus, 1924)
Deuterophysa biconicalis (Hampson, 1918)
Deuterophysa coniferalis (Hampson, 1918)
Deuterophysa costimaculalis Warren, 1889
Deuterophysa fernaldi Munroe, 1983
Deuterophysa flavidalis (Hampson, 1918)
Deuterophysa grisealis Hampson, 1917
Deuterophysa luniferalis (Hampson, 1913)
Deuterophysa obregonalis Schaus, 1924
Deuterophysa pallidifimbria (Dognin, 1909)
Deuterophysa purpurealis (Hampson, 1913)
Deuterophysa sanguiflualis (Hampson, 1913)
Deuterophysa subrosea (Warren, 1892)

Former species
Deuterophysa micralis Hampson, 1907

References

Pyraustinae
Taxa named by William Warren (entomologist)
Crambidae genera